Testosterone isovalerate, also known as testosterone isopentanoate, testosterone 17β-isovalerate, and androst-4-en-17β-ol-3-one 17β-isovalerate, is a synthetic, injected anabolic-androgenic steroid (AAS) and an androgen ester – specifically, the C17β isovalerate (isopentanoate) ester of testosterone – which was never marketed. It is a prodrug of testosterone and, when administered via intramuscular injection, is associated with a long-lasting depot effect and extended duration of action.

See also
 Testosterone isobutyrate
 Testosterone isocaproate
 Testosterone valerate

References

Androgens and anabolic steroids
Androstanes
Ketones
Prodrugs
Testosterone esters
Abandoned drugs
Isovalerate esters